Abigail Mickey (born July 3, 1990) is an American former professional racing cyclist, who rode professionally between 2014 and 2019 for the , ,  and  teams.

See also
 List of 2015 UCI Women's Teams and riders

References

External links
 

1990 births
Living people
American female cyclists
Sportspeople from Aspen, Colorado
21st-century American women